Bradley Osborne (born 18 January 1962) is a South African cricketer. He played in 72 first-class and 80 List A matches from 1979/80 to 1994/95.

References

External links
 

1962 births
Living people
South African cricketers
Border cricketers
Free State cricketers
Cricketers from Durban